Joe McMenamin (15 October 1912 – 27 November 1991) was an Irish sailor. He competed in the Dragon event at the 1972 Summer Olympics.

References

External links
 

1912 births
1991 deaths
Irish male sailors (sport)
Olympic sailors of Ireland
Sailors at the 1972 Summer Olympics – Dragon
Place of birth missing